Beaver Township is one of twenty-six townships in Iroquois County, Illinois, USA.  As of the 2010 census, its population was 527 and it contained 229 housing units.

Geography

Cities, towns, villages
 Donovan

Unincorporated towns
 Hooper at 
(This list is based on USGS data and may include former settlements.)

Cemeteries
The township contains these two cemeteries: Beaver and J H Grant Memorial.

Major highways
  U.S. Route 52

Airports and landing strips
 Loy Airport
 Russell Airport

Demographics

School districts
 Donovan Community Unit School District 3

Political districts
 Illinois's 15th congressional district
 State House District 79
 State Senate District 40

References
 
 United States Census Bureau 2007 TIGER/Line Shapefiles
 United States National Atlas

External links
 City-Data.com
 Illinois State Archives

Townships in Iroquois County, Illinois
Townships in Illinois